Robert Scheuermeier (born July 31, 1927) was the first Principal of the Karnataka Theological College, Mangalore, a Seminary affiliated to the country's first University, the Senate of Serampore College (University), Serampore.

Ecclesiastical ministry

Switzerland
Scheuermeier was ordained in 1952 by the Swiss Reformed Church of the Canton of Berne, Switzerland and held ministerial roles at the Churches in Utzenstorf from 1952 to 1954 and at Reichenbach im Kandertal from 1954 to 1956.  After a decade of overseas work in India from 1957 to 1967, Scheuermeier resumed the role of a Minister, this time at Kirchberg, Bern from 1967 till 1981.

India
Scheuermeier came to India in 1957 and undertook language studies in Kannada for a year and began to teach at the Basel Evangelical Mission Theological Seminary (BEMTS) at Mangalore.  In 1960, when S. J. Samartha, the Seminary Principal moved to the United Theological College, Bangalore to teach Religions, the Seminary Council appointed Scheuermeier as the Seminary Principal.

By this time, ecumenical conversations were taking place to merge the Basel Mission with the Church of South India.  As a prelude to it, the two vernacular medium (Kannada) Protestant regional seminaries in Karnataka affiliated to the Senate of Serampore College (University), namely,
 the Basel Evangelical Mission Theological Seminary, Mangalore formed in 1847 (managed by the Basel Mission) and
 the Union Kanarese Seminary, Tumkur formed in 1915 (managed by the Church of South India),
were merged in 1965 resulting  in the formation of the Karnataka Theological College in the premises of the erstwhile Basel Evangelical Mission Theological Seminary in Mangalore.  Scheuermeier was appointed as the first principal of the new entity, a post which he held for two years until 1967, when he left India for good making the College Council to appoint the Old Testament Scholar C. D. Jathanna, who had by that time returned from the University of Hamburg, Germany where he was pursuing doctoral studies.

Germany
While Scheuermeier was ministering at Kirchberg, Bern, he was appointed as India Secretary in 1982 at the Stuttgart-based Association of Churches and Missions in South Western Germany/Evangelical Mission in Solidarity and entrusted with the task of building up theological education of the partner Church in India, the Church of South India and made efforts to forge greater ties for building up ecclesiastical cooperation among the Dioceses within the Church of South India and the Association of Churches and Missions in South Western Germany.  The continued representation of the EMS in the Church of South India synods as well as in the Society of the United Theological College, Bangalore attests to this fact.  When Scheuermeier retired from the EMS, Stuttgart on attaining superannuation, he pitched for having an Indian as India Secretary at the EMS resulting in the appointment of C. L. Furtado in 1992 to succeed Scheuermeier.

Contribution
In the postcolonialism scenario, Scheuermeier who was teaching in Mangalore from 1958 onwards was a strong advocate for the development of Indian christian theology, an indigenous theology free from western influence.  K. M. George who authored Church of South India, Life in Union 1947-1997 covering a period of 50 years right from the founding of the Church of South India in 1947 till 1997, wrote that the Basel Mission merged into the Church of South India in 1968 as a result of protracted ecumenical efforts that began as early as 1936.

Scheuermeier was part of the ecumenical talks between the Basel Mission and the Church of South India in his capacity as Principal of the Basel Evangelical Mission Theological Seminary in Mangalore.

Recognition and honour
In 2013, the country's first University, the Senate of Serampore College (University) conferred the honorary doctorate degree by honoris causa upon Scheuermeier.

References

Christian clergy from Mangalore
20th-century Christian clergy
Indian Christian theologians
Academic staff of the Senate of Serampore College (University)
Swiss Protestant ministers
1927 births
Living people
Swiss expatriates in India